Anna Bon, Russian/Italian composer and singer.
 Bartolomeo Bon, Italian sculptor and architect
 Bhakti Hridaya Bon, Indian guru
 François Bon, French novelist
 Louis André Bon, French general
 Marcel Bon, French mycologist
 Michel Bon, French businessman and politician
 Naftali Bon, Kenyan runner
 Piet Bon (b. 1946), Dutch rower
 Simon Bon (1904–1987), Dutch rower, father of Piet
 Bon Scott, deceased singer with AC/DC
 Léon van Bon, Dutch cyclist
 Jon Bon Jovi, American Singer with Bon Jovi
 William Bon Mardion, French ski mountaineer

See also
Bon (disambiguation)